On the 4th September 1885 a wagon loaded with dynamite exploded at Douro, Ontario, Canada killing two men and their horses.

The blast was felt 50 miles away. A historical plaque marks the location.

Background 

George Morton and James Simmons were transporting a wagon load of dynamite from Tweed, Ontario to Burleigh Falls, Ontario to be used for the rock blasting of the Trent Canal lock. They stayed overnight at a hotel in Indian River on 3rd September 1885.

Events of 4th September 1885 

Their load exploded at 9:45am on 4th September 1885 on the 6th Line (road) at Douro, Ontario, noted as being a corduroy road and rough to travel in poor weather. Both men were killed in the blast, and the The Peterborough Examiner reported in 1960 that the only parts of the men that were found were "a finger, two tiny sections of a skull, a tiny piece of cheek identified by the whiskers, and what appeared to be a man's shoulder that was found hanging on the branch of a tree 300 ft distant." The blast blew the metal shoes off the horses hooves and broke windows in Lakefield and Campbellford. The shock wave was felt in Tweed, 50 miles away.

Sources at the time describe a 8 foot deep by 60 feet wide crater, and 1960s sources report a 10 feet deep and 70 wide crater being left by the blast and trees were flattened in a radius that varied between 50 and 75 yards.

Public interest 
The blast site aroused public interest for subsequent weeks. Reports on visitor numbers vary between 300 and 1,000.

References 

1885 in Ontario
Explosions in Canada
Industrial accidents and incidents in Canada
Deaths by explosive device